DeWayne Christopher Burns (born June 22, 1972) is an American politician serving as a member of the Texas House of Representatives from the 58th district. Elected in 2014, he assumed office in 2015.

Early life and education 
Burns was raised on a farm in Johnson County, Texas. He graduated from Cleburne High School in 1990. After attending Texas A&M University, he earned a Bachelor of Science degree in agricultural services and development from Tarleton State University.

Career 
After graduating from college, Burns worked for the Texas Grain and Feed Association. He later joined the staff of representatives Arlene Wohlgemuth and Gary Walker as a legislative analyst. He later joined the Texas Department of Agriculture, working under then-Commissioner Rick Perry as coordinator for special issues. Burns was elected to the Texas House of Representatives in 2014 and assumed office in 2015. Burns also serves as chair of the House Agriculture and Livestock Committee.

References

External links
 Campaign website
 State legislative page

1972 births
Living people
People from Cleburne, Texas
Tarleton State University alumni
Republican Party members of the Texas House of Representatives
21st-century American politicians